The Minister for Economy is the minister responsible for the economy of the Republic of Abkhazia. It was created in 1993 after the 1992–1993 war between Abkhazia and Georgia.

List of people to hold the office

References

External links
 Official site 

Politics of Abkhazia
Members of the Unrepresented Nations and Peoples Organization